Henton is a surname. Notable people with the surname include:

Anthony Henton (born 1963), American football player
Antonio Henton (born 1987), American football player
Brian Henton (born 1946), English racing driver
John Henton (born 1960), American actor and comedian
LaDontae Henton (born 1992), American basketball player

See also
Henton D. Elmore (1921–1991), American politician